For main Top 5 Division, see: 2013 Asian Five Nations

The 2013 Asian Five Nations division tournaments, known as the 2013 HSBC Asian 5 Nations due to the tournament's sponsorship by the HSBC, referred to the divisions played within the tournament. This was the 6th series of the Asian Five Nations.

Changes from 2012
 Kazakhstan participated in the Division 1 tournament, haven been relegated from the Top 5.
 Philippines was promoted to the Top 5 Division, following promotions form Division 3 to Division 2, then Division 2 to Division 1.
 Thailand have replaced Singapore in Division 1, with Singapore competing in Division 2.
 India will compete in Division 2 - replacing China, following promotion from Division 3.
 Qatar becomes the first team to be promoted out of Division 4, replacing Pakistan who are demoted to Division 4.
 Laos becomes the first team to be promoted out of Division 5, though no team was demoted out of Division 4.

Teams
The teams involved, with their world rankings pre tournament, were:

Division 1
  (60)
  (35)
  (47)
  (59)

Division 2
  (67)
  (NA)
  (64)
  (66)

Division 3
  (68)
  (87)
  (NA)
  (NA)

Division 4
  (NA)
  (NA)
  (79)
  (NA)

Division 5
  (NA)
  (NA)

Division 1

Division one will be held in a round-robin format. All games will be played at Havelock Park in Sri Lanka between March 31 and April 6, 2013.

Table

Points are awarded to the teams as follows:

Fixtures

Touch judges:
 Aaron Littlewood
 Mohamed Cader
 Sean Moore

Touch judges:
 Taku Otsuki
 Priyantha Gunarathna
 Sean Moore

Touch judges:
 Taizo Hirabayashi
 Aaron Littlewood
 Sean Moore

Division 2

Semi-finals

Third place play-off

Final

Division 3

Semi-finals

Third place play-off

Final

Division 4

Semi-finals

Third place play-off

Final

Division 5

Game 1

Game 2

References

External links
Official Website
ARFU

2013
2013 in Asian rugby union
Asia